George Dodington may refer to:
 George Dodington (died 1720) (c. 1662–1720), English Whig politician.
 George Dodington, 1st Baron Melcombe (1691–1762), English politician
 George Dodington (died 1757) (1681–1757), English MP